The American Association of Neurological Surgeons (AANS) is a scientific and educational association focused on advancing the specialty of neurological surgery. The organization has over 8,000 members around the world. It is one of the five Continental Associations of the World Federation of Neurosurgical Societies (WFNS), the other four being the AASNS, CAANS, EANS and FLANC.

History 

Founded in 1931, the AANS was originally known as the Harvey Cushing Society, named for the brain surgery pioneer Harvey Cushing. The creation of the society was spurred initially by R. Glen Spurling and William P. Van Wagenen who, with Cushing, acknowledged the need for a venue in which younger neurosurgeons could exchange ideas on the specialty. Membership to the Society of Neurological Surgeons, the specialty's key organization during this period, was closed to younger men at this time. Spurling and Van Wagenen enlisted the help of Temple Fay and R. Eustace Semmes in the creation of the group, and on May 6, 1932, the Harvey Cushing Society held its first meeting in Boston. Twenty-three people attended, many of whom were Cushing's colleagues and neurosurgical trainees.

Other charter members of the society were Gilbert Anderson, Paul C. Bucy, W. Edward Chamberlain, Leo M. Davidoff, Louise Eisenhardt, Edgar Fincher, John F. Fulton, W. James Gardner, William J. German, Franc D. Ingraham, Franklin Jelsma, Edgar Kahn, Roland Klemme, James G. Lyerly Sr., Eric Oldberg, Tracy Putnam, Frederic Schreiber, Merril C. Sosman, and Frank R. Teachenor.

Significant dates 
 1942 – The AANS adopts new bylaws requiring active members to be certified by the American Board of Neurological Surgery (ABNS).
 1944 – The first issue of theJournal of Neurosurgery is printed. An editorial board had been established in 1943, and Louise Eisenhardt was named editor-in-chief.
 1967 – At its annual meeting in San Francisco, the Harvey Cushing Society changes its name to the American Association of Neurological Surgeons (AANS). The group also revamps its membership requirements, now noting that only board-certified neurosurgeons could be considered for active membership. Associate memberships are available for those in related neurological disciplines. This same year, the William P. Van Wagenen Fellowship is established to provide educational funding to medical students.
 1969 – The association observes the 100-year anniversary of Harvey Cushing's birth by holding its annual meeting in his birthplace of Cleveland and issuing a commemorative stamp via the United States Postal Service.
 1976 – A headquarters office is established in downtown Chicago. The office moves to Park Ridge, Illinois in 1984, and subsequently to its current location in Rolling Meadows, Illinois in 2000.
 1988 – The United States Postal Service issues an official Harvey Cushing stamp on June 17 as part of its "Great Americans" 45-cent stamp collection.

Membership 
The AANS is composed of board-certified neurosurgeons from around the world as well as medical students, neurosurgical support staff, and physicians in associated fields of practice.

Legislative advocacy
Throughout its history, the AANS has taken stances on a number of key legislative issues affecting neurosurgical professionals and their patients. Efforts include patient safety and quality improvement, tort reform, and issues relating to the Emergency Medical Treatment and Active Labor Act. In addition to a professional staff office in Washington, D.C., the AANS maintains a member-driven Washington Committee to advocate for a number of causes. Washington staff maintains the Neurosurgery Blog which highlights the latest legislative activities affecting health care and the neurosurgical specialty.

Publications 
Since 1944, the AANS has published the Journal of Neurosurgery. In addition, the quarterly AANS Neurosurgeon focuses on "issues related to legislation, workforce and practice management." Each issue is centered on different themes, and past themes include humanitarian neurosurgery, neurosurgeons as patients, stereotactic radiosurgery, and neurovascular neurosurgery.

Patient information and public outreach
On its website, the AANS presents information relevant to patients regarding a number of neurosurgical ailments and treatments. In addition to its efforts during National Neurosurgery Awareness Week (which is held in conjunction with the AANS Annual Scientific Meeting and heightens public awareness on topics such as stroke), the AANS also spearheads Neurosurgery Outreach Month every August, touting the importance of concussion and head-injury prevention at the start of a new school year and season for student athletes.

Education 
The AANS offers its members a number of educational opportunities, mostly through courses held around the country at various times of the year. Topics include practice management, oral board preparation, maintenance of certification, and resident education. Course offerings also extend to mid-level practitioners such as nurses and physician assistants.

Annual meeting 
The AANS has held an Annual Scientific Meeting every year since its 1932 inception except twice; in 1945 due to World War II, and in 2020 due to the COVID-19 pandemic. The 2021 meeting was exclusively virtual, also due to the pandemic.

Programming includes presentations of neurological studies, seminars, workshops for practitioners at all levels, and keynote speeches. Past speakers include H. Ross Perot (1987), Colin Powell (1995), George H. W. Bush (1999), Tom Brokaw (2001), Benazir Bhutto (2002),  Henry Kissinger (2003), Ken Burns (2004), Walter Isaacson (2013), and Chesley Sullenberger (2013).

Neurosurgical Research and Education Foundation 
Established by the AANS in 1981, the Neurosurgery Research and Education Foundation provides funding for training in the neurosciences and support for career neurosurgeons. Through grants and awards, it supports residents and young neurosurgical faculty in conducting basic science, patient-oriented, clinical and outcomes research, as well as outcomes studies that protect and support neurosurgical procedures for all practicing neurosurgeons. It also funds North American and international fellowships in all neurosurgical subspecialties.

Neuropoint Alliance 
As an effort led by the AANS with cooperation of other organized neurological associations, the Neuropoint Alliance was founded in 2008 to collect, analyze, and report clinical data from neurosurgical practices. Services include clinical trial management, study design, and survey facilitation. Its first nationwide effort was the National Neurosurgery Quality and Outcomes Database.

AANS Award Winners 
The AANS presents several major awards each year during the AANS Annual Scientific Meeting, honoring the lifetime contribution of members for their surgical, scientific and humanitarian accomplishments.

Cushing Medal
 1977 Frank H. Mayfield, MD
 1978 William H. Sweet, MD
 1979 Henry G. Schwartz, MD
 1980 Paul C. Bucy, MD
 1981 Bronson S. Ray, MD
 1982 W. James Gardner, MD
 1983 Guy L. Odom, MD
 1984 Eben Alexander Jr., MD
 1985 Francis Murphey, MD
 1986 Lyle French, MD
 1987 William F. Meacham, MD
 1988 Charles G. Drake, MD
 1989 Lester A. Mount, MD
 1990 Robert B. King, MD
 1991 William F. Collins, MD
 1992 W. Eugene Stern, MD
 1993 Sidney Goldring, MD
 1994 Byron C. Pevehouse, MD
 1995 Richard DeSaussure, MD
 1996 Shelley N. Chou, MD, PhD
 1997 Robert G. Ojemann, MD
 1998 Albert L. Rhoton Jr., MD, FAANS
 1999 David J. Kelly Jr., MD, FAANS
 2000 Russell H. Patterson Jr., MD
 2001 Julian T. Hoff, MD
 2002 Edward R. Laws Jr., MD, FAANS
 2003 Stewart B. Dunkser, MD, FAANS
 2004 John A. Jane Sr., MD, PhD, FAANS
 2005 Martin H. Weiss, MD, FAANS
 2006 David G. Kline, MD, FAANS
 2007 Robert G. Grossman, MD, FAANS
 2008 Charles B. Wilson, MD, FAANS
 2009 Edward H. Oldfield, MD, FAANS
 2010 Roberto C. Heros, MD, FAANS
 2011 A. John Popp, MD, FAANS
 2012 Donald O. Quest, MD, FAANS(L)
 2013 Jon H. Robertson, MD, FAANS
 2014 Troy M. Tippett, MD, FAANS(L)
 2015 Arthur L. Day, MD, FAANS
 2016 Ralph G. Dacey Jr., MD, FAANS
 2017 Robert F. Spetzler, MD, FAANS
 2018 James R. Bean, MD, FAANS
 2019 James T. Rutka, MD, PhD, FAANS

AANS Distinguished Service Award 
 1993 Roy W. Black, Codman & Shurtlett, Vice President
 1994 William A. Buchheit, MD, FAANS
 1995 Charles Edwin Bracket, MD, FAANS
 1996 Robert E. Florin, MD, FAANS
 1997 Ernest W. Mack, MD
 1998 Mark J. Kubala, MD, FAANS
 1999 W. Ben Blackett, MD, JD, FAANS
 2000 George Ablin, MD
 2000 Robert H. Wilkins, MD, FAANS
 2001 Frank P. Smith, MD
 2002 Donald H. Stewart Jr., MD, FAANS
 2003 John A. Jane Sr., MD, PhD, FAANS
 2004 Troy M. Tippett, MD, FAANS
 2005 John A. Kusske, MD, FAANS
 2006 John C. Van Gilder, MD
 2007 Mary Louise Sanderson
 2008 Peter W. Carmel, MD, FAANS
 2009 In Memory Of Samuel J. Hassenbush, MD, PhD
 2010 Katie O. Orrico
 2011 Thomas A. Marshall
 2012 James R. Bean, MD, FAANS
 2013 Ralph G. Dacey Jr., MD, FAANS
 2014 Sir Graham Teasdale, FRCP
 2015 Kim J. Burchiel, MD, FAANS
 2016 Blas Ezequiel Lopez Felix, MD, FAANS
 2017 Volker K.H. Sonntag, MD, FAANS(L)
 2018 Robert E. Harbaugh, MD, FAANS, FACS
 2019 M. Ross Bullock, MD, PhD

AANS Humanitarian Award 
 1987 Courtland H. Davis Jr., MD, FAANS
 1988 Gaston Acosta-Rua, MD
 1989 Hugo V. Rizzoli, MD
 1990 A. Roy Tyrer Jr., MD
 1991 George B. Udvarhelyi, MD
 1992 William H. Mosberg Jr., MD
 1993 Manuel Velasco-Suarez, MD
 1994 E. Fletcher Eyster, MD, FAANS
 1995 Melvin L. Cheatham, MD, FAANS
 1997 Robert J. White, MD
 1998 Lee Finney, MD,
 1999 Thomas B. Flynn, MD, FAANS
 2000 Merwyn Bagan, MD, MPH, FAANS
 2001 Gary D. Vander Ark, MD, FAANS
 2002 Edgar M. Housepian, MD, FAANS
 2004 Charles L. Branch Sr., MD,FAANS
 2005 Tetsuo Tatsumi, MD, FAANS
 2006 Gene E. Bolles, MD, FAANS
 2007 Benjamin C. Warf, MD, FAANS
 2008 Robert J. Dempsey, MD, FAANS
 2009 Armonando J. Basso, MD, PhD
 2010 Timr Banerjee, MD, FAANS
 2011 Barth A. Green, MD
 2012 A. Leland Albright, MD, FAANS(L)
 2013 Mark Bernstein, MD, FAANS
 2014 Anselmo Pineda, MD, FAANS(L)
 2015 Michael M. Haglund, MD, PhD, FAANS
 2016 Karin M. Muraszko, MD, FAANS
 2017 John Ragheb, MD, FAANS
 2018 Jack P. Rock, MD, FAANS
 2019 David I. Sandberg, MD, FAANS

AANS Cushing Award for Technical Excellence and Innovation in Neurosurgery
 2013	Edward H. Oldfield, MD, FAANS
 2014	Robert H. Rosenwasser, MD, FAANS
 2015	Ossama Al-Mefty, MD, FAANS
 2016	L. Dade Lunsford, MD, FAANS
 2017	Fady T. Charbel, MD, FAANS
 2018	John R. Adler, Jr., MD, FAANS
 2019	Kevin T. Foley, MD, FAANS

AANS International Lifetime Recognition Award
 2008 Jose Humberto Mateos Gomez, MD, FAANS(L), from Madrid, Mexico
 2009 Albino Bricolo, MD, from Verona, Italy
 2010 Shigeaki Kobayashi, MD, PhD, from Matsumoto, Japan
 2011 Shigeaki Kobayashi, MD, PhD, from Matsumoto, Japan
 2012 Leonidas M. Quintana, MD, IFAANS, from Vina del Mar, Chile
 2013 Johannes Schramm, MD, from Bonn, Germany
 2014 Nicolas de Tribolet, MD, from Geneva, Switzerland
 2015 Andrew H. Kaye, MD, IFAANS, from Melbourne, Australia
 2016 Edgardo Spagnuolo, MD, from Montevideo Uruguay
 2017 André Grotenhuis, MD, PhD, IFAANS, from Nijmegen, Netherlands
 2018 Jeffrey V. Rosenfeld, MD, MS, IFAANS, FACS
 2019 Franco Servadei, MD, Italy
 2020 B. K. Misra

References

External links 
 

Learned societies of the United States
Medical and health organizations based in Illinois
Neurosurgery organizations
Surgical organizations based in the United States
Medical and health professional associations in Chicago